Roderick Francis Macdonald, Lord Uist is a Scottish retired judge. As a Senator of the College of Justice, he was a member of the Court of Session, Scotland's highest court.

Early life
Macdonald was educated at St Mungo's Academy, a Roman Catholic state school in Glasgow, and at the University of Glasgow Faculty of Law. (LL.B. Hons.). He was admitted to the Faculty of Advocates in 1975.

Legal career
Macdonald served as an Advocate Depute from 1987 to 1993, from 1990 as Home Advocate Depute. He was appointed Queen's Counsel in 1989. He was called to the Bar of England and Wales in 1997 (Inner Temple). From 1995 to 2001, he was Legal Chairman of the Pension Appeal Tribunals for Scotland, and from 1995 to 2000 was a member of the Criminal Injuries Compensation Board, and of the Criminal Injuries Compensation Appeals Panel from 1997–1999. He was appointed a Temporary Judge in 2001, and in 2006 was appointed a full-time judge of the Court of Session and High Court of Justiciary, Scotland's Supreme Courts, as a Senator of the College of Justice. He took the judicial title Lord Uist, sat in the Outer House, and retired on 1 February 2021.

Prominent cases Macdonald has presided over included the 2006 trial of three of the race hate murderers of Kriss Donald.

See also
Historic list of Senators of the College of Justice

References

Living people
1951 births
Alumni of the University of Glasgow
Scottish King's Counsel
20th-century King's Counsel
Members of the Inner Temple
Uist
Members of the Faculty of Advocates
People educated at St Mungo's Academy